Brad Davis (born 1990) is an Australian cricketer. He made his first-class debut for South Australia in the 2018–19 Sheffield Shield season on 11 March 2019. In April 2021, Davis was one of five players to be dropped by the South Australia cricket team, following a season without any wins.

References

External links
 

1990 births
Living people
Australian cricketers
Place of birth missing (living people)
South Australia cricketers